HMAS Hankow was a coal hulk of the Royal Australian Navy (RAN) between 1913 until 1932.

Built in 1869 by Alexander Stephen and Sons, Linthouse as the composite fully rigged ship City of Hankow, for George Smith & Sons. Sold to G. J. Robertson, Sydney in 1900.

She was bought by the RAN in July 1913 and commissioned as HMAS Hankow for use as a coal hulk at the Garden Island Naval Base. She was towed to Thursday Island in 1923 as a hulk for the Thursday Island Coaling Station. Returned to Sydney on 11 November 1927 for refit and returned to Thursday Island on 18 January 1929.

Citations

References
Wilson, Michael; Royal Australian Navy 21st Century Warships, Naval auxiliaries 1911 to 1999 including Defence Maritime Services, Profile No. 4 - Revised Edition, Topmill Pty Ltd, Marrickville. 

1869 ships
Ships built on the River Clyde
Auxiliary ships of the Royal Australian Navy
Shipwrecks of the Northern Territory